Harrison H. Wheeler (March 22, 1839 – July 28, 1896) was a politician from the U.S. state of Michigan.

Biography
Wheeler was born at Farmers Creek in Lapeer County, Michigan and attended the common schools.  He taught school until 1861 and the outbreak of the Civil War.  He enlisted in the Union Army, November 1, 1861, as a private in Company C, Tenth Regiment, Michigan Volunteer Infantry. He was promoted to second lieutenant in June 1862, then first lieutenant of Company E in the same regiment, in April 1863. He was captain of Company F in the same regiment in April 1865.  At the close of the war, he settled in Bay City, Michigan.

Wheeler was elected clerk of Bay County in 1866.  He studied law, was admitted to the bar in 1868, and  commenced practice in Bay City.  He was a member of the Michigan Senate (27th District) from 1871 to 1872.  He moved to Ludington the following year and again served in the state Senate (24th District) from 1873 to 1874.  He was appointed circuit judge in 1874 and later elected to the office only to resign in June 1878.  He was appointed postmaster April 16, 1878, and served until his successor was appointed on April 26, 1882.  He resumed the practice of law in Ludington.

In 1890, was elected as a Democrat from Michigan's 9th congressional district to the 52nd United States Congress, defeating incumbent Republican Byron M. Cutcheon. Wheeler served from March 4, 1891, to March 3, 1893.  He was defeated in 1892 by Republican John W. Moon.

Harrison H. Wheeler was appointed United States pension agent at Detroit on February 8, 1894, and served until his death.  He died at Farmers Creek, near Lapeer and is interred in Lakeview Cemetery of Ludington.

See also

References
 Retrieved on 2008-02-14
The Political Graveyard

1839 births
1896 deaths
Democratic Party Michigan state senators
Michigan state court judges
Union Army soldiers
Burials in Michigan
Democratic Party members of the United States House of Representatives from Michigan
19th-century American politicians
People from Lapeer County, Michigan
19th-century American judges